Spymaker: The Secret Life of Ian Fleming is a 1990 TV biographical film of the life of Ian Fleming, creator of the James Bond spy character, retracing his playboy youth, his expulsion from several colleges, his experiences as a newspaper writer and his tour of duty for the British intelligence agency during World War II. Fleming himself is played by Jason Connery, son of Sean Connery, the actor who first played Bond in the film series. Ex-Bond girl Fiona Fullerton, who appeared in A View To A Kill, made an appearance.

Plot

Cast
 Jason Connery as Ian Fleming
 Kristin Scott Thomas as Leda St Gabriel
 Joss Ackland as German SS Generaloberst Hielstien
 Patricia Hodge as Lady Evelyn Fleming
 David Warner as Admiral Godfrey, S.O.E. Military Intelligence
 Colin Welland as Reuters World News Editor
 Fiona Fullerton as Lady Caroline Hornsby
 Richard Johnson as General Hornsby
 Julian Firth as Quincy
 Marsha Fitzalan as Miss Delaney
 Ingrid Held as Countess De Turbinville
 Hugo Bower as German SS Major
 Clive Mantle as Marine Sergeant Ellis
 Leo Fenn as young Ian Fleming
 Tara McGowran as Daphne
 Edita Brychta as Maya
 Octavia Verdin as Colette
 Brendon Nolan as S.O.E. Agent
 Kate Humble as The Red-Head (credited as Lauren Heston)
 Robert Longden as Professor Whitman

External links

1990 television films
1990 films
1990s biographical films
American biographical films
American television films
Works about Ian Fleming
Spy television films
1990s English-language films
Films directed by Ferdinand Fairfax
1990s American films